Tomás Rojas may refer to:
 Tomás Rojas (boxer), Mexican boxer
 Tomás Rojas (actor), Mexican actor
 Tomás Rojas (footballer), Paraguayan footballer